Damon Jesse Gause (June 17, 1915 – March 9, 1944) was an American military officer who served in the United States Army Air Corps. He was captured and escaped from Bataan, then Corregidor. He served with the Ninth Air Force and flew with the Hell Hawks.

Early life and education
Gause was born in Fort Valley, Georgia in 1915, the son of Duff Adolph Gause (1893–1965) and Jescyne W. Gause (1895–1978). The couple had two additional sons, Wilson A. Gause (1923–2006) and John Winston Gause (1925–2005).

Gause graduated from the Martin Institute High School. After high school, he attended the University of Georgia. After one year, Gause left school to join the United States Coast Guard.

Career
In the United States Coast Guard, Gause was assigned to the USCG Cutter Argo (WPC-100), where his main duty was radioman. He joined the Army Air Corps to serve in Panama after three years of service in the Coast Guard.

Following a three-year stint in the Army, he went to work in the oil fields in Colombia for the Texaco Oil Company. In 1939, Gause went back to Georgia. He again enlisted in the Army Air Corps in 1941 and qualified for flight training at Kelly Field in Texas. Gause completed the training and earned his wings as an aircraft pilot and received a commission as second lieutenant. He returned to Georgia, this time at Savannah, Georgia to serve with the 27th Bombardment Group. He trained on A-24 Banshee dive-bombers.

Operation PLUM

The Philippines. Gause, 2nd Lieutenant, 17th Squadron, 27th Bombardment Group, in the Philippines.
The Great Escape of Major Gause.

Australia
Safe Again in Australia.

England
On February 13, 1944, 1st Lieutenant Harold B. Johnston took off from Gosfield, England in a P-47 Thunderbolt for a test flight, and died when his plane crashed only nine days before the first combat mission of the Hell Hawks and the P-47s. The Hell Hawks were part of the Ninth Air Force. The combat mission occurred on February 22, 1944, with several groups taking part in an uneventful run to escort bombers. Colonel Lance Call led one group. Another group was led by Major Rockford V. Gray, with Gause as wingman. Other groups were led by Major Donald E. Hillman and Major William D. Ritchie. In preparation to support the Allied invasion of Europe, the Hell Hawks moved with the 365th Fighter Group to RAF Beaulieu, Hants, England on 5 March 1944. During a test flight on March 9, 1944, Gause was killed when his P-47 crashed near Beaulieu, England.

Personal life 
On October 11, 1941, Gause married Lillian Ruth Evans Carter (1921–2014) and the couple had one son Damon Gause Jr. (1943–2006). Gause was buried in the Cambridge American Cemetery and Memorial at Coton, South Cambridgeshire District, Cambridgeshire, England.

Awards and decorations
Distinguished Service Cross
Air Medal
American Campaign Medal
Asiatic Pacific Campaign Medal
European-African-Middle Eastern Campaign Medal
World War II Victory Medal

Accolades and honors
In Georgia, U.S. Highway 129 South, also known as the Major Damon Gause Bypass is named in his honor.

Bibliography
Gause, Damon Rocky (1999). The War Journal of Major Damon "Rocky" Gause. D. L. Gause (Ed.). Hyperion Books. 
Osborne, William L. (18 July 2013). Voyage into the Wind. CreateSpace.

References

External links

1915 births
1944 deaths
People from Fort Valley, Georgia
People from Peach County, Georgia
Aviators killed in aviation accidents or incidents in England
University of Georgia alumni
United States Coast Guard enlisted
Texaco people
People from Georgia (U.S. state)
People from Savannah, Georgia
United States Army Air Forces officers
United States Army Air Forces pilots of World War II
American prisoners of war in World War II
Escapees from Japanese detention
United States Army Air Forces personnel killed in World War II
World War II prisoners of war held by Japan
American escapees